is a former Japanese football player. She played for Japan national team.

Club career
Takara was born in Naha on April 9, 1990. After graduating from high school, she joined INAC Kobe Leonessa from 2009. She moved to Vegalta Sendai. In 2017, she moved to Norwegian Toppserien club LSK Kvinner. She retired end of 2017 season.

National team career
On September 22, 2013, Takara debuted for Japan national team against Nigeria. She played 3 games for Japan until 2015.

National team statistics

References

External links

Japan Football Association
Vegalta Sendai

1990 births
Living people
Association football people from Okinawa Prefecture
Japanese women's footballers
Japan women's international footballers
Nadeshiko League players
INAC Kobe Leonessa players
Mynavi Vegalta Sendai Ladies players
Women's association football midfielders